Calicium abietinum, commonly known as fir pin or black stubble, is a crustose lichen that is found growing on trees throughout much of the world.

The species is found in North America from Mexico to Canada, England, Central Europe to Central Scandinavia, Asia, South America and in the South West of Western Australia.

References

abietinum
Lichen species
Lichens described in 1797
Lichens of Australia
Lichens of Asia
Lichens of North America
Lichens of Europe
Lichens of South America
Taxa named by Christiaan Hendrik Persoon